The 2017–18 Loyola Ramblers women's basketball team represents Loyola University Chicago during the 2017–18 NCAA Division I women's basketball season. The Ramblers, led by second year head coach Kate Achter, play their home games at the Joseph J. Gentile Arena and were members of the Missouri Valley Conference. They finished the season 7–23, 5–13 in MVC play to finish in a tie for eighth place. They lost in the first round of the Missouri Valley women's tournament to Valparaiso.

Previous season
They finished the season 2–28, 2–16 in MVC play to finish in last place. They lost in the first round of the Missouri Valley women's tournament to Bradley.

Roster

Schedule

|-
!colspan=9 style=| Exhibition

|-
!colspan=9 style=| Non-conference regular season

|-
!colspan=9 style=| Missouri Valley regular season

|-
!colspan=9 style=| Missouri Valley Women's Tournament

See also
2017–18 Loyola Ramblers men's basketball team

References

Loyola Ramblers women's basketball seasons
Loyola
Loyola Ramblers women
Loyola Ramblers women
2010s in Chicago
2017 in Illinois
Loyola Ramblers women